Carabus akinini elisabethae is a black-coloured subspecies of ground beetle from family Carabidae, that is endemic to Kazakhstan.

References

akinini elisabethae
Beetles described in 1908
Endemic fauna of Kazakhstan
Taxa named by Andrey Semyonov-Tyan-Shansky